Hold-Up is a 2000 Austrian comedy film directed by Florian Flicker.

Cast 
 Roland Düringer - Andreas Berger, Räuber
 Josef Hader - Werner Kopper, Kunde
 Joachim Bißmeier - Josef Böckl, Schneider
 Birgit Doll - Böckels 'Schwester'
 Sonja Romei - Maria Berger (Andis Frau)
 Valentin Frais - Jakob
 Ulrike Beimpold - Gertrude Bacher
 Klaus Ortner - Herbert Bacher
 Klaus Händl - Herbert Bacher

Reception
It was the second most popular Austrian film of the year after Komm, süßer Tod, which was released late in the year.

References

External links 

2000 comedy films
2000 films
Austrian comedy films